Sur (also Romanized as Sūr, Savar, and Soor) is a village in Pachehlak-e Sharqi Rural District, in the Central District of Aligudarz County, Lorestan Province, Iran. According to the 2006 census, the population of Sur was 717, in 145 families.

References 

Towns and villages in Aligudarz County